There are 60 colleges and universities in the U.S. state of South Carolina. The University of South Carolina in Columbia is the largest university in the state, by enrollment.  Trident Technical College in North Charleston is the largest two-year college.  The oldest institution is the College of Charleston, founded in 1770 and chartered in 1785.

The majority of colleges and universities in South Carolina are accredited by the Southern Association of Colleges and Schools (SACS). There are six four-year and two two-year historically black colleges and universities.

The Medical University of South Carolina in Charleston, the University of South Carolina School of Medicine in Columbia and the University of South Carolina School of Medicine in Greenville are the only medical schools in the state accredited by the Liaison Committee on Medical Education (LCME). 

Charleston School of Law and the University of South Carolina School of Law are American Bar Association (ABA) approved law schools.

Institutions

Defunct colleges
 The Arsenal, Columbia, sister school of The Citadel, burned during the Civil War. The only surviving building is now the South Carolina Governor's Mansion.

Out-of-state institutions
Schools based in other states offer programs at locations in South Carolina:
ECPI University has campuses in Charleston, Columbia, and Greenville
Edward Via College of Osteopathic Medicine has a campus in Spartanburg
Miller-Motte Technical College has campuses in North Charleston and Conway
South University has a campus in Columbia
Strayer University has a campus in Greenville
University of Phoenix has a campus in Columbia

See also

 Higher education in the United States
 List of college athletic programs in South Carolina
 List of American institutions of higher education
 List of recognized higher education accreditation organizations
List of colleges and universities
List of colleges and universities by country

Notes

References

External links
Department of Education listing of accredited institutions in South Carolina

South Carolina
Colleges